Thomas Boehm (born 21 July 1956 in Gelnhausen) is a German immunologist. He is the Director of the Max Planck Institute for Immunobiology and Epigenetics in Freiburg im Breisgau. He has won a variety of prizes for his research work.

Life 

Boehm completed his medical studies at the Johann Wolfgang Goethe University Frankfurt am Main. He received his doctorate in 1982 and then worked as a research assistant in paediatrics and biochemistry at  Frankfurt University Hospital. In 1988 he qualified as a  professor of biochemistry. From 1987 to 1991 he was a visiting researcher and then a research associate at the Laboratory of Molecular Biology of Cambridge University. In 1991 he received a professorship at the Albert Ludwigs University of Freiburg and in 1994 a joint professorship at Heidelberg University and the German Cancer Research Center in Heidelberg. Since 1998 he has been a director at the Max Planck Institute for Immunobiology and Epigenetics in Freiburg im Breisgau.

Research 

Boehm deals with the evolution of the immune system, the development of the thymus and the relationships between lymphocytes and the interstitium. He was able to achieve groundbreaking advances in the study of the thymus. With the help of comparative studies of different animal species, essential properties of the immune systems of all vertebrates could be identified - in particular the structure of the immune system and the basis of its adaptability. Control mechanisms that cause the maturation and differentiation of immune cells were elucidated in his laboratory. Experiments with the production of artificial thymus glands have also been successful. More recent work deals with the development and function of genetic networks that are required for immune tolerance in antigen detection in vertebrates and invertebrates.

Boehm has been Chairman of the Board of Trustees of the  since 2018.

Selected works

Books

Articles

Awards and distinctions 

 1987 Research Prize of the Kind Phillips Foundation for Leukemia Research (with ) for Investigations into the genetic heterogeneity of human leukemia by analyzing the DNA arrangements of immunoglobulin genes, T cell receptor genes and cellular oncogenes 
 1997 Gottfried Wilhelm Leibniz Prize
 2002 member of the European Molecular Biology Organization
 2002 member of the German National Academy of Sciences Leopoldina
 2012 member of the Heidelberg Academy of Sciences and Humanities
 2014 Ernst Jung Prize for Medicine
 2020 
 2021 Member of the American Academy of Arts and Sciences
 2021 Heinrich Wieland Prize

References

External links 
Laboratory Thomas Boehm at Max Planck Institute for Immunobiology and Epigenetics
Vita at Max-Planck-Gesellschaft 

Living people
1956 births
German immunologists
Goethe University Frankfurt alumni
Academic staff of Goethe University Frankfurt
Academic staff of the University of Freiburg
Academic staff of Heidelberg University
Max Planck Institute directors